W. tinctoria may refer to:
 Weinmannia tinctoria, a plant species found in Mauritius and Réunion
 Wrightia tinctoria, a plant species found in India

See also
 Tinctoria